Russon is a surname. Notable people with the surname include:

Alice Russon, Irish actress, singer, and dancer
John Russon (born 1960), Canadian philosopher
Leonard Russon, American judge
Penni Russon (born 1974), Australian writer of children's literature and young adult fiction

Bobby Russon (born 1984), Canadian criminal and civil liberties lawyer.